Rodeo is the debut studio album by American rapper and record producer Travis Scott. It was released on September 4, 2015, through Grand Hustle Records and distributed by Epic Records. The album features guest appearances from Quavo, Future, 2 Chainz, Juicy J, Kacy Hill, The Weeknd, Swae Lee, Chief Keef, Kanye West, Justin Bieber, Young Thug, Toro y Moi and Schoolboy Q, while the production was provided by Scott himself, alongside several high-profile record producers such as WondaGurl, Allen Ritter, Mike Dean, Metro Boomin, Frank Dukes, and Sonny Digital, among others.

Rodeo was supported by two singles: "3500" and "Antidote". The latter became his highest-charting single in the US Billboard Hot 100 at the time, peaking at number 16. The album received generally favorable reviews from critics and debuted at number three on the US Billboard 200. In May 2017, the album was certified platinum by the Recording Industry Association of America (RIAA).

Background
Travis Scott announced the release date for Rodeo through social media on July 17, 2015. In the CR Fashion Book, Scott stated his life was like a rodeo and he feels like he is trying to stay on a bucking animal:

Promotion 
On January 26, 2015, to support the album, Scott announced he would embark on The Rodeo Tour with Young Thug and Metro Boomin. On January 27, the following day, Scott released two new songs; "High Fashion" featuring Future, and "Nothing But Net" featuring Young Thug and PartyNextDoor. However, neither of them ended up being on the final version of the album. On June 12, 2015, a track titled "Drunk" featuring Young Thug, leaked online.

Singles
On June 8, 2015, Scott released the album's lead single, "3500", which features guest appearances from American rappers Future and 2 Chainz. It peaked at number 82 on the US Billboard Hot 100.

On July 29, 2015, Scott released the album's second single, "Antidote". The song peaked at number 16 on the Billboard Hot 100.

Critical reception

Rodeo was met with generally favorable reviews. At Metacritic, which assigns a normalized rating out of 100 to reviews from mainstream publications, the album received an average score of 64, based on 15 reviews. Aggregator AnyDecentMusic? gave it 5.5 out of 10, based on their assessment of the critical consensus.

Roger Krastz of XXL stated, "Overall, Rodeo has plenty of bangers and noteworthy collaborations that help bring out a fantastic trap sound that could bleed into the mainstream of hip-hop in no time". Jason Bisnoff of HipHopDX stated, "Rodeos back end after "Antidote" begin to mesh together and gets repetitive.... Nonetheless, the originality of Scott's sound within this new movement provides for a strong rookie effort leaving the listener excited for a career that is just getting started". Trazier Tharpe of Complex stated, "Travis Scott made an enjoyable album for his fans peppered with undeniable bangers for his detractors". David Jeffries of AllMusic stated, "With Rodeo, Travis Scott becomes a designer drug". Steve "Flash" Juon of RapReviews stated, "Somewhere beneath all the hype and production he does shine through". Martin Caballero of The Boston Globe stated, "His versatility, combined with a high-profile guest list, conspires against him; among 14 tracks, Scott conjures just a handful of moments that hint at untapped reserves of talent".

Matthew Cooper of Clash stated, "Yes, the production is razor sharp, the beats are skewed and often very loud which makes them feel important, but in reality, it's all a façade; an image". Kevin Ritchie of Now stated, "Scott goes for spacey sounds, stoner vibes and vocal filters, but despite the eclecticism, he's too elusive and bland for Rodeo to amount to a stylistic--let alone a subversive--statement". Sheldon Pearce from Pitchfork stated, "He is most effective when he harshly distorts his vocals to create texture, and in the company of others he can serve as a welcome change of pace". David Turner from Rolling Stone stated, "Left on his own, Scott can grow tiresome. "I Can Tell" sounds monochromatic without another voice to push this astute curator. Some rock stars are better leading bands than going solo". Matthew Ramirez of Spin stated, "This is a cold, calculated record lacking in personality, though it certainly tries to deliver something that Scott is incapable of".

Year-end lists

Commercial performance 
Rodeo debuted at number three on the US Billboard 200, moving 85,000 album-equivalent units, of which 70,000 are pure album sales. As of November 2015, Rodeo has sold 110,000 copies in the United States. In May 2017, the album was certified platinum by the Recording Industry Association of America (RIAA) for combined sales and album-equivalent units of over one million units.

Track listing

Notes
 signifies an additional producer
 signifies a co-producer
 All tracks are stylized in lowercase on the physical back covers. For example, "Oh My Dis Side" is stylized as "oh my dis side".
 "Pornography", "Wasted" and "Apple Pie" feature narration by T.I.
 "Oh My Dis Side" features additional vocals by River Tiber
 "90210" features background vocals by Chantel Jeffries
 "Flying High" features background vocals by Pharrell Williams
 "Ok Alright" features additional vocals by SZA and Kacy Hill
 "Never Catch Me" features additional vocals by Tinashe

Sample credits
  "Pornography" contains a sample from "Expectation", written by Torsten Olafsson, Finn Olafsson, Peter Mellin, and Glen Fisher, as performed by Ache.
  "Wasted" contains a sample from "Havin' Thangs '06", written by Michael Barnett, Will Barnett, Chad Butler, and George Clinton, Jr., as performed by Pimp C featuring Big Mike; and a sample from "Let Your Life Be Free", written by T. Noporat, as performed by T. Zchien and the Johnny.
  "Antidote" contains a sample from "All I Need", written by Thomas Brenneck, David Guy, Leon Michels, Nicholas Movshon, and Homer Steinweiss, as performed by Lee Fields and the Expressions.
  "Flying High" contains a portion of "Slide", written by Mark Adams, Carter Bradley, Tim Dozier, Mark Hicks, Tom Lockett, Jr., Floyd Miller, Danny Webster, and Orion Wilhoite, as performed by Slave.

Personnel
Credits adapted from the album's liner notes.

Musicians
 Travis Scott – vocals
 Quavo – vocals (track 2)
 2 Chainz – vocals (track 3)
 Future – vocals (track 3)
 Juicy J – vocals (track 4)
 The Weeknd – vocals (track 6)
 Swae Lee – vocals (track 7)
 Chief Keef – vocals (track 7)
 Kanye West – vocals (track 8)
 Justin Bieber – vocals (track 11)
 Young Thug – vocals (track 11)
 Toro y Moi – vocals (track 12)
 T.I. – narrator
 Mike Dean – guitar, keyboards
 Darren King – bass, drums, guitar
 Larrance Dopson – keyboards
 Jordan Lewis – guitar
 Terrace Martin – keyboards
 Allen Ritter – keyboards
 Zaytoven – keyboards

Additional personnel
 Kevin Amato – photography
 Chiki Uno – set design, art direction 
 Corey Damon Black – art direction, design
 Chris Feldmann – art direction
 Dan Chung – design
 Anita Marisa Boriboon – creative direction
 Marc Kalman – creative direction

Technical personnel
 Travis Scott – executive production, production
 Mike Dean – executive production, production, additional production, assistant, drum programming, engineering, mixing, mastering
 Jason Geter – executive production
 Allen Ritter – production, additional production
 Metro Boomin – production (tracks 1, 3, 4, 7, 15)
 Frank Dukes – production (tracks 2, 11), additional production (track 4)
 WondaGurl – production (track 9), additional production (tracks 5, 16), programming
 Noah Goldstein – co-production (track 8), engineering, mixing, assistant
 The Weeknd – production (track 6)
 Illangelo – production (track 6), vocal engineering
 Ben Billions – production (track 6)
 Darren King – co-production (track 8)
 Kanye West – production (track 8)
 Charlie Heat – production (track 8)
 Eestbound – production (track 9), programming
 Pharrell Williams – production (track 12)
 Terrace Martin – co-production (track 14)
 1500 or Nothin' – co-production (track 14)
 Zaytoven – additional production (track 3)
 FKi – production (track 13)
 Maneesh Bidaye – production (track 11)
 Apex Martin – additional drum programming (track 5)
 Jimmy Cash – engineering
 Thomas Cullison – engineering
 Blake Harden – engineering
 Stuart Innis – engineering, mixing assistance
 Jordan Lewis – engineering
 Ari Raskin – engineering
 Alex Tumay – engineering
 Finis White – engineering
 Seth Firkins – vocal engineering
 Kez Khou – mixing assistance
 Albert Chee – assistance

Charts

Weekly charts

Year-end charts

Certifications

References

2015 debut albums
Albums produced by Travis Scott
Albums produced by Kanye West
Albums produced by Zaytoven
Epic Records albums
Grand Hustle Records albums
Albums produced by Frank Dukes
Albums produced by DJ Dahi
Albums produced by Pharrell Williams
Albums produced by Metro Boomin
Albums produced by Mike Dean (record producer)
Albums produced by Southside (record producer)
Albums produced by Sonny Digital
Albums produced by Terrace Martin
Albums produced by WondaGurl
Travis Scott albums
Albums produced by 1500 or Nothin'
Albums produced by TM88
Albums produced by Allen Ritter
Trap music albums